Restless may refer to:

Psychomotor agitation, restlessness experienced as a result of certain medications or conditions

Music 
 Restless Records

Albums
 Restless (Sara Evans album) and its title track, 2003
 Restless (Murray Head album), 1984
 Restless, an album by Bob James
 Restless (Kasey Lansdale album), 2013
 Restless (Shelby Lynne album), 1995
 Restless (Amy Meredith album), 2010
 Restless (Skydiggers album), 1992
 Restless (Starpoint album), 1985
 Restless, Randy California album, 1985
 Restless (Trae album), 2006
 Restless, an album by Snowy White & the White Flames
 Restless (Faye Wong album), 1996
 Restless (Xzibit album), 2000
 Restless, an album by Elaiza
 Restless (EP), a 2019 album by Trevor Daniel

Songs
 "Restless" (Elton John song), 1984
 "Restless" (Carl Perkins song), 1968
 "Restless" (Switchfoot song), 2011
 "Restless" (New Order song), 2015
 "Restless" (Allday song, featuring The Veronicas), 2019
 "Restless" (Within Temptation song), 1997
 "Restless" (Neja song), 1998
 "Restless" (The Damned song), 1986
 "Restless", a song by Evil Nine
 "Restless", a 2011 song by Kakkmaddafakka
 "Restless", a song by Alison Krauss
 "Restless", a song by Gordon Lightfoot
 "Restless", a song from The Servants' album Disinterest
 "Restless", a song by White Dawg

Other media 
Restless (1998 film), a Chinese-American romance film
Restless (2000 film), a Finnish romantic film
The Restless (2006 film), a South Korean fantasy film
Restless (2011 film), an American film directed by Gus Van Sant
The Restless (2021 film), Belgian film
Restless (2022 film), a French film
"Restless" (Buffy the Vampire Slayer), an episode of Buffy the Vampire Slayer
Restless (novel), a 2006 novel by William Boyd
Restless (TV series), a 2012 British TV adaptation of William Boyd's novel

See also 
Agitation (disambiguation), a synonym for restlessness